Banksia nivea, commonly known as honeypot dryandra, is a species of rounded shrub that is endemic to Western Australia. The Noongar peoples know the plant as bulgalla. It has linear, pinnatipartite leaves with triangular lobes, heads of cream-coloured and orange or red flowers and glabrous, egg-shaped follicles.

Description
There are between 45 and 85 triangular lobes on each side of the leaves.

Taxonomy and naming
Banksia nivea was first collected by Jacques Labillardière in the vicinity of Esperance Bay between 15 and 17 December 1792, during a search for the naturalist Claude Riche, who had become lost on the Australian mainland. Labillardière formally described and figured the species in Relation du Voyage à la Recherche de la Pérouse, his account of the voyage published in 1800.

In 1810 Robert Brown transferred it into a new genus, Dryandra as D. nivea.

In 1996, Alex George described two subspecies of Dryandra nivea:
 Dryandra nivea (Labill.)

In 2007 Austin Mast and Kevin Thiele transferred all Dryandra species into Banksia, reinstating Labillardière's Banksia nivea and renaming the two subspecies B. nivea Labill. subsp. nivea and B. nivea (A.S.George) A.R.Mast & K.R.Thiele subsp. uliginosa, the names accepted by the Australian Plant Census. A third subspecies (B. nivea subsp. Morangup (M.Pieroni 9/42) WA Herbarium) has been named but not yet formally described.<ref name="APC3">{{cite web |title=Banksia nivea subsp. Morangup' (M.Pieroni 9/42) WA Herbarium |url=https://biodiversity.org.au/nsl/services/apc-format/display/210288 |website=Australian Plant Census |access-date=18 May 2020}}</ref>

Distribution and habitat
Honeypot dryandra is widespread between Lake Indoon (near Eneabba), Ongerup and Israelite Bay. Subspecies nivea grows in woodland and kwongan Subspecies uliginosa has a narrow distribution from east of Busselton and on the Scott River plain where it grows in thick scrub.

Ecology
Species of nectarivorous birds that have been observed feeding on B. nivea include Acanthorhynchus superciliosus (western spinebill). Black cockatoos have also been recorded feeding upon the seed, though it is not clear which species of black cockatoo was observed, Calyptorhynchus baudinii (Baudin's black cockatoo) or C. latirostris (Carnaby's black cockatoo).<ref name="Barker 1984">{{cite book |author1=Barker, R. D. |author2=Vestjens, W. J. M. | year = 1984 | title = The Food of Australian Birds | publisher = Melbourne University Press | isbn = 0-643-05006-X | pages = 1:331; 2':238, 458}}</ref>

Conservation status
Subspecies nivea is classified as "not threatened" by the Western Australian Government Department of Parks and Wildlife, but subsp. uliginosa'' is classified as "Threatened Flora (Declared Rare Flora — Extant)" by the Department of Environment and Conservation (Western Australia).

References

 

nivea
Endemic flora of Western Australia
Eudicots of Western Australia
Taxa named by Jacques Labillardière
Plants described in 1800